Beşiktaş–Fenerbahçe rivalry is a Turkish football rivalry involving two of the most successful clubs in the Süper Lig. It is also a local derby, one of many involving Istanbul clubs. The fixture is almost a century in existence and has developed into an intense and often bitter one, traditionally attracting large attendances.

History
The first game played between the two sides was a match inbetween 2 neighborhoods: Bloemhofplein and afrikaanderplein.

Fan's rivalry
Beşiktaş and Fenerbahçe are among the most popular Turkish clubs; both sides have large fanbases that follow them in domestic and international matches. Football hooliganism is a very common phenomenon between their fans in recent years, featuring anything from breaking seats, cursing, fighting, fireworks and street rioting.

Football rivalry 
Both clubs compete each other for the title of the most successful football club in Turkey. Both clubs have won 34 official titles. Fenerbahçe has  been more successful in their head-to-head fixtures.

Culture
The clubs originate from two different sides of the Bosphorus. Beşiktaş J.K. was founded in the district and municipality of Beşiktaş, located on the European side of Istanbul. Fenerbahçe S.K. was founded in the district of Kadıköy, located in the Asian side of Istanbul. Both clubs naturally draw the majority of their support from the side of the city that they are native to, but maintain a significant majority of support drawn from the remainder of Turkey.

Honours
{| class="wikitable" style="text-align:center; font-size:95%"
|-
! Competition
! width="120" | Beşiktaş
! width="120" | Fenerbahçe
|-
|League titles
|16

|19
|-
| Turkish Cup
| 10| 6
|-
| Turkish Super Cup
| 9
| 9
|-
| Ataturk Cup
| 1
| 1
|-
| Prime Minister's Cup
| 6
| 8|-
| Spor Toto Cup
| 3| 1
|- 
| Balkans Cup
| 0
| 1|-
| Istanbul Football League
| 13
| 16|-
| Istanbul Shield
| 1
| 4|-
| Istanbul Cup
| 2| 1
|-
| Total| 66| 75|}
Turkish Football Federation Website

Supporters
A poll involving 1.4 million people asked for the team the support in Turkey by bilyoner.com showed that alongside Galatasaray with 35%, Fenerbahçe with 34% and Beşiktaş with 19% make up most fans.pool made by bilyoner.com

Istanbul Football League matches

Süper Lig matches

Turkish Cup matches

Super Cup matches

Head-to-head ranking in Süper Lig

• Total: Beşiktaş with 25 higher finishes, Fenerbahçe with 38 higher finishes (as of the end of the 2021–22 season).

Statistics

Head-to-head
As of 8 May 2022

Biggest wins (5+ goals)

Most consecutive wins

Most consecutive draws

Most consecutive matches without a draw

Longest undefeated runs

Highest scoring matches

Most consecutive matches without conceding a goal

Most consecutive games scoring

 Player 

Most appearances

Last update: 7 October 2012

Top scorers

Last update: 7 October 2012

Most goals by a player in a match

Men in both teamsPlayers from Beşiktaş to Fenerbahçe Refik Osman Top
 Saadet Tokcan
 Taci Eke
 Halil Köksalan
 Mustafa Güven
 Güray Erdemir
 Selim Soydan
 Şenol Birol
 Birol Pekel
 Engin İpekoğlu
 Feyyaz Uçar
 Saffet Sancaklı
 Sergen Yalçın
 Alpay Özalan
 Oktay Derelioğlu
 Tümer Metin
 Burak Yılmaz
 Egemen Korkmaz
 İsmail Köybaşı
 Tolgay Arslan
 José Sosa
 Michy BatshuayiPlayers from Fenerbahçe to Beşiktaş Özcan Arkoç
 Ali Soydan
 Gürcan Berk
 Ali Kemal Denizci
 Adem İbrahimoğlu
 Tayfur Havutçu
 Ahmet Yıldırım
 Emre Aşık
 Ali Güneş
 Murat Şahin
 Mustafa Doğan
 Tayfun Korkut
 Fahri Tatan
 Mert Nobre
 Mehmet Yozgatlı
 Rüştü Reçber
 Yusuf Şimşek
 Mehmet Aurélio
 Uğur Boral
 Mamadou Niang
 Gökhan Gönül
 Caner Erkin
 Jeremain Lens
 Josef de Souza
 Salih Uçan
 Mehmet Topal
 Mert GünokManagers for both teams'''
 Cihat Arman
 Enver Katip
 Abdulah Gegić
 Branko Stanković
 Christoph Daum
 Mustafa Denizli

See also
The Intercontinental Derby
Beşiktaş–Galatasaray rivalry
Major football rivalries
Big Three (Turkey)

External links
Beşiktaş JK Website
Fenerbahçe SK Website

References

Süper Lig
Turkey football rivalries
Fenerbahçe S.K. (football)
Beşiktaş Football